Stig Roar Husby (born 12 September 1954 in Trondheim, Sør-Trøndelag) is a retired Norwegian long-distance runner. He represented Strindheim IL and IL i BUL.

In 3000 metres he finished fourth at the 1973 European Junior Championships and eighth at the 1985 European Indoor Championships. He finished tenth in marathon at the 1983 World Championships but did not finish at the 1984 Summer Olympics. He became Norwegian champion in 5000 metres in 1983 and 1985  and in 10,000 metres in 1975, 1979, 1980 and 1983.

He has his education from the Norwegian School of Sport Sciences.

Personal bests
3000 metres - 7:50.92 min (1985) - eleventh among Norwegian 3000 m runners.
5000 metres - 13:27.53 min (1984) - eighth among Norwegian 5000 m runners.
10,000 metres - 28:32.88 min (1983) - thirteenth among Norwegian 10,000 m runners.
Half marathon - 1:03:38 min (1988) 
Marathon - 2:11:29 min (1983) - second among Norwegian marathon runners, only behind Geir Kvernmo.

Achievements

References
sports-reference

1954 births
Living people
Norwegian male long-distance runners
Athletes (track and field) at the 1984 Summer Olympics
Olympic athletes of Norway
Norwegian School of Sport Sciences alumni
Sportspeople from Trondheim